This is a list of the mammal species recorded in the Dominican Republic. Of the mammal species in the Dominican Republic, one is critically endangered, one is endangered, three are vulnerable, and eight are considered to be extinct.

The following tags are used to highlight each species' conservation status as assessed by the International Union for Conservation of Nature:

Order: Sirenia (manatees and dugongs) 

Sirenia is an order of fully aquatic, herbivorous mammals that inhabit rivers, estuaries, coastal marine waters, swamps, and marine wetlands. All four species are endangered.

Family: Trichechidae
Genus: Trichechus
 West Indian manatee, T. manatus

Order: Rodentia (rodents) 
Rodents make up the largest order of mammals, with over 40% of mammalian species. They have two incisors in the upper and lower jaw which grow continually and must be kept short by gnawing.

Suborder: Hystricomorpha
Family: Echimyidae
Subfamily: Heteropsomyinae
Genus: Brotomys
 Hispaniolan edible rat, B. voratus 
Family: Capromyidae
Tribe: Plagiodontini
Genus: Hyperplagiodontia
 Wide-toothed hutia, H. araeum 
Genus: Plagiodontia
 Hispaniolan hutia, P. aedium 
 Samaná hutia, P. ipnaeum 
 Small Haitian hutia, P. spelaeum 
Genus: Rhizoplagiodontia
 Lemke's hutia, R. lemkei 
Subfamily: Isolobodontinae
Genus: Isolobodon
 Montane hutia, I. montanus 
 Puerto Rican hutia, I. portoricensis 
Subfamily: Hexolobodontinae
Genus: Hexolobodon
 Imposter hutia, H. phenax 
Family: Heptaxodontidae
Subfamily: Heptaxodontinae
Genus: Quemisia
 Twisted-toothed mouse, Q. gravis 
Suborder: Muridae
Family: Muridae
Genus: Rattus
 Brown rat, R. norvegicus  introduced
 Black rat, R. rattus  introduced
Genus: Mus
 House mouse, M. musculus  introduced

Order: Eulipotyphla (shrews, hedgehogs, moles, and solenodons) 

Eulipotyphlans are insectivorous mammals. Shrews and solenodons closely resemble mice, hedgehogs carry spines, while moles are stout-bodied burrowers.

Family: Nesophontidae
Genus: Nesophontes
 Atalaye nesophontes, N. hypomicrus 
 Western Cuban nesophontes, N. micrus 
 St. Michel nesophontes, N. paramicrus 
 Haitian nesophontes, N. zamicrus 
Family: Solenodontidae
Genus: Solenodon
 Marcano's solenodon, S. marcanoi 
 Hispaniolan solenodon, S. paradoxus

Order: Chiroptera (bats) 
The bats' most distinguishing feature is that their forelimbs are developed as wings, making them the only mammals capable of flight. Bat species account for about 20% of all mammals.

Family: Vespertilionidae
Genus: Eptesicus
 Big brown bat, E. fuscus 
Genus: Lasiurus
 Minor red bat, L. minor 
Family: Noctilionidae
Genus: Noctilio
 Greater bulldog bat, N. leporinus 
Family: Molossidae
Genus: Molossus
 Velvety free-tailed bat, M. molossus 
Genus: Nyctinomops
 Big free-tailed bat, N. macrotis 
Genus: Tadarida
 Mexican free-tailed bat, T. brasiliensis 
Family: Mormoopidae
Genus: Mormoops
 Antillean ghost-faced bat, M. blainvillei 
Genus: Pteronotus
 Parnell's mustached bat, P. parnellii 
 Sooty mustached bat, P. quadridens 
Family: Phyllostomidae
Subfamily: Phyllostominae
Genus: Macrotus
 Waterhouse's leaf-nosed bat, M. waterhousii 
Genus: Erophylla
 Brown flower bat, E. bombifrons 
Subfamily: Brachyphyllinae
Genus: Brachyphylla
 Cuban fruit-eating bat, B. nana 
Subfamily: Phyllonycterinae
Genus: Phyllonycteris
 Cuban flower bat, P. poeyi 
Subfamily: Glossophaginae
Genus: Monophyllus
 Leach's single leaf bat, M. redmani 
Subfamily: Stenodermatinae
Genus: Artibeus
 Jamaican fruit bat, A. jamaicensis 
Genus: Phyllops
 Cuban fig-eating bat, P. falcatus 
Family: Natalidae
Genus: Chilonatalus
 Cuban funnel-eared bat, C. micropus 
Genus: Natalus
 Hispaniolan greater funnel-eared bat, N. major 
 Mexican funnel-eared bat, N. stramineus

Order: Cetacea (whales) 

The order Cetacea includes whales, dolphins and porpoises. They are the mammals most fully adapted to aquatic life with a spindle-shaped nearly hairless body, protected by a thick layer of blubber, and forelimbs and tail modified to provide propulsion underwater.

Suborder: Mysticeti
Family: Balaenopteridae (baleen whales)
Genus: Balaenoptera 
 Common minke whale, B. acutorostrata 
 Sei whale, B. borealis 
 Bryde's whale, B. brydei 
 Blue whale, B. musculus 
 Fin whale, B. physalus 
Genus: Megaptera
 Humpback whale, M. novaeangliae 
Suborder: Odontoceti
Superfamily: Platanistoidea
Family: Delphinidae (marine dolphins)
Genus: Delphinus
 Short-beaked common dolphin, D. delphis 
Genus: Feresa
 Pygmy killer whale, F. attenuata 
Genus: Globicephala
 Short-finned pilot whale, G. macrorhyncus 
Genus: Grampus
 Risso's dolphin, G. griseus 
Genus: Lagenodelphis
 Fraser's dolphin, L. hosei 
Genus: Orcinus
 Killer whale, O. orca 
Genus: Peponocephala
 Melon-headed whale, P. electra 
Genus: Pseudorca
 False killer whale, P. crassidens 
Genus: Stenella
 Pantropical spotted dolphin, S. attenuata 
 Clymene dolphin, S. clymene 
 Striped dolphin, S. coeruleoalba 
 Atlantic spotted dolphin, S. frontalis 
 Spinner dolphin, S. longirostris 
Genus: Steno
 Rough-toothed dolphin, S. bredanensis 
Genus: Tursiops
 Common bottlenose dolphin, T. truncatus
Family: Physeteridae (sperm whales)
Genus: Physeter
 Sperm whale, P. macrocephalus 
Family: Kogiidae (dwarf sperm whales)
Genus: Kogia
 Pygmy sperm whale, K. breviceps 
 Dwarf sperm whale, K. sima 
Superfamily Ziphioidea
Family: Ziphidae (beaked whales)
Genus: Mesoplodon
 Blainville's beaked whale, M. densirostris 
 Gervais' beaked whale, M. europaeus 
Genus: Ziphius
 Cuvier's beaked whale, Z. cavirostris

Order: Primates (primates) 
There are 190 – 448 species of living primates, depending on which classification is used. They have an opposable thumb for grasping objects.
Suborder: Haplorhini
Infraorder: Simiiformes
Family: Pitheciidae
Subfamily: Callicebinae
Tribe: Xenotrichini
Genus: Antillothrix
 Hispaniola monkey, A. bernensis

Order: Carnivora (carnivorans) 

There are over 260 species of carnivorans, the majority of which feed primarily on meat. They have a characteristic skull shape and dentition.
Suborder: Pinnipedia 
Family: Phocidae (earless seals)
Genus: Neomonachus
 Caribbean monk seal, N. tropicalis 
Family: Procyonidae
Genus: Procyon
 Common raccoon, P. lotor  introduced
Family: Herpestidae
Genus: Urva
 Small Indian mongoose, U. auropunctata  introduced

Order: Artiodactyla (even-toed ungulates) 

The even-toed ungulates are ungulates – hoofed animals – which bear weight equally on two (an even number) of their five toes: the third and fourth. The other three toes are either present, absent, vestigial, or pointing posteriorly.
Family: Cervidae
Subfamily: Capreolinae
Genus: Odocoileus
 White-tailed deer, O. virginianus  introduced
Family Suidae (pigs)
Genus: Sus
Wild boar, S. scrofa  introduced

See also
List of chordate orders
Lists of mammals by region
Mammal classification

Notes

References
 

Dominican Republic
Mammals

Dominican Republic